Ikramullah is a male Muslim given name and surname, meaning glory of God. It may refer to

Males
Mohammed Ikramullah (born 1903), first Foreign Secretary of Pakistan
Sayed Ikramuddin Masoomi (born 1953), Afghan politician
Ikramullah Khan Niazi, father of Imran Khan
Ikramullah Sheikh, Pakistani cricketer

Females
(The following are the wife and three daughters of Mohammed Ikramullah.)
Shaista Suhrawardy Ikramullah (1915-2000), Pakistani politician, diplomat and author
Salma Ikramullah, maiden name of Salma Sobhan (1937-2003), Pakistani-British-Bangladeshi barrister, human rights activist and academic
Naz Ikramullah (born 1938), Pakistani-British-Canadian artist
Sarvath Ikramullah, maiden name of Princess Sarvath El Hassan (born 1947), Pakistani wife of Jordanian prince

Arabic masculine given names
Pakistani masculine given names